Umm al-Hamam or Um al-Hamam is a village south of Qatif, Saudi Arabia.

The village is about 3 km from the Persian Gulf coast, to the east. It has a population of about 25,000 people. Most of the residents work in the oil industry, farming, and fishing. To the north is Al-Quaa, to the northeast is Al-Zawikiyah, and to the south is Al-Jableh.

References

External links
 Umm al-Hamam website

Populated places in Eastern Province, Saudi Arabia
Qatif